The following is a chronological list of classical music composers who lived in, worked in, or were citizens of France.

Medieval
Leonin (c. 1150 – 1201)
Perotin (1160 – 1230)
Adam de la Halle (1240 – 1287)
Philippe de Vitry (1291 – 1361)
Guillaume de Machaut (c. 1300 – 1377)

Renaissance
Guillaume Dufay (c. 1397 – 1474)
Gilles Binchois (c. 1400 – 1460)
Loÿset Compère (c. 1445 – 1518)
Josquin des Prez (c. 1450 – 1521), born near Franco-Flemish border
Pierre de La Rue (c. 1452 – 1518)
Jean Mouton (c. 1459 – 1522)
Antoine Brumel (c. 1460 – 1512/1513)
Clément Janequin (c. 1485 – 1558)
Claudin de Sermisy (c. 1490 – 1562)
Nicolas Gombert (c. 1495 – c. 1560)
Ninot le Petit (fl. c. 1500 – 1520)
Pierre de Manchicourt (c. 1510 – 1564)
Claude Gervaise (fl. 1540 – 1560)
Jean Titelouze (c. 1562/63 – 1633)

Baroque
Pierre Guédron (c. 1570 – c. 1620)
Antoine Boësset (1586–1643)
Étienne Moulinié (c. 1599 – after 1669)
Jacques Champion de Chambonnières (c. 1601 – 1672)
Denis Gaultier (1603–1672)
François Dufault (before 1604 – c. 1672)
Jacques de Gouy (c. 1610 – after 1650)
Michel Lambert (1610–1696)
Louis Couperin (c. 1626 – 1661)
Jean-Henri d'Anglebert (1629–1691)
Jean-Baptiste Lully (1632–1687)
Monsieur de Sainte-Colombe (c. 1640 – c. 1700)
Marc-Antoine Charpentier (1643–1704)
Robert de Visée (c. 1655 – 1732/1733)
Marin Marais (1656–1728)
Michel Richard Delalande (1657–1726)
André Campra (1660–1744)
Élisabeth Jacquet de La Guerre (1665–1729)
Jean-Féry Rebel (1666–1747)
Michel Pignolet de Montéclair (1667–1737)
François Couperin (1668–1733)
Louis Marchand (1669–1732)
Louis de Caix d'Hervelois (c. 1670 – c. 1760)
Gaspard Corrette (1671–before 1733)
Antoine Forqueray (1671–1745)
Nicolas de Grigny (1672–1703)
Jacques-Martin Hotteterre (1674–1763)
Louis-Nicolas Clérambault (1676–1749)
Jean-François Dandrieu (c. 1682 – 1738)
Jean-Joseph Mouret (1682–1738)
Jean-Philippe Rameau (1683–1764)
François d'Agincourt (1684–1758)
Joseph Bodin de Boismortier (1689–1755)
Louis-Claude Daquin (1694–1772)
Jean-Marie Leclair the elder (1697–1764)
François Francoeur (1698–1787)
Michel Blavet (1700–1768)
Christophe Moyreau (1700–1774)
Jean-Marie Leclair the Younger (1703–1777)
Joseph-Nicolas-Pancrace Royer (c. 1705 – 1755)
Louis-Gabriel Guillemain (1705–1770)
Michel Corrette (1707–1795)
Jean-Joseph de Mondonville (1711–1772)

Classical era
Jacques Duphly (1715–1789)
François-André Danican Philidor (1726–1795)
Joseph Touchemoulin (1727–1801)
François Joseph Gossec (1734–1829)
André Grétry (1741–1813)
Simon Le Duc (1742–1777)
Chevalier de Saint-Georges (1745–1799)
Nicolas Dalayrac (1753–1809)
Jean-Baptiste Bréval (1753–1823)
Ignaz Pleyel (1757–1831)
Jean-François Lesueur (1760–1837)
Olivier Aubert (1763–c.1830)
Étienne Méhul (1763–1817)
Rodolphe Kreutzer (1766–1831)
Louis-Emmanuel Jadin (1768–1853)
Charles Simon Catel (1773–1830)
Pierre Rode (1774–1830)
François-Adrien Boieldieu (1775–1834)
Hyacinthe Jadin (1776–1800)
Pauline Duchambge (1778–1858) 
Jacques Féréol Mazas (1782–1849)

Romantic
Daniel Auber (1782–1871)
George Onslow (1784–1853)
Nicolas-Charles Bochsa (1789–1856)
Ferdinand Hérold (1791–1833)
Fromental Halévy (1799–1862)
Victor Magnien (1802–1885)
Adolphe Adam (1803–1856)
Hector Berlioz (1803–1869)
Louise Farrenc (1804–1875)
Louise Bertin (1805–1877)
Napoléon Coste (1805–1883)
Auguste Pilati (1810–1877)
Ambroise Thomas (1811–1896)
Charles-Valentin Alkan (1813–1888)
Eugène Louis-Marie Jancourt (1815–1901)
Jean-Chrisostome Hess (1816–1900)
Louis James Alfred Lefébure-Wély (1817–1869)
Charles Dancla (1817–1907)
Charles Gounod (1818–1893)
Jacques Offenbach (1819–1880)
Charles-Louis Hanon (1819–1900)
Pauline Viardot (1821–1910)
César Franck (1822–1890)
Édouard Lalo (1823–1892)
Joseph Jean-Baptiste Laurent Arban (1825–1889)
Charles Delioux (1825–1915)
Joseph O'Kelly (1828–1885)
Georges Pfeiffer (1835–1908)
Camille Saint-Saëns (1835–1921)
Léo Delibes (1836–1891)
Alexandre Guilmant (1837–1911)
Théodore Dubois (1837–1924)
Georges Bizet (1838–1875)
Henri Ghys (1839–1908)
Emmanuel Chabrier (1841–1894)
Georges Lamothe (1842–1894)
Jules Massenet (1842–1912)
Claude-Paul Taffanel (1844–1908)
Charles-Marie Widor (1844–1937)
Gabriel Fauré (1845–1924)
Henri Duparc (1848–1933)
Benjamin Godard (1849–1895)
Clément Broutin (1851–1889)
Vincent d'Indy (1851–1931)
André Messager (1853–1929)
Ernest Chausson (1855–1899)
Alfred Bruneau (1857–1934)
Cécile Chaminade (1857–1944)
Jules Auguste Wiernsberger (1857–1925)
Mélanie Bonis (1858–1937)
Gustave Charpentier (1860–1956)

Modern/contemporary
Claude Debussy (1862–1918)
Maurice Emmanuel (1862–1938)
Gabriel Pierné (1863–1937)
Guy Ropartz (1864–1955)
Paul Dukas (1865–1935)
Albéric Magnard (1865–1914)
Erik Satie (1866–1925)
Charles Koechlin (1867–1950)
Jules Mouquet (1867–1946)
Albert Roussel (1869–1937)
Louis Vierne (1870–1937)
Charles Tournemire (1870–1939)
Florent Schmitt (1870–1958)
Henri Büsser (1872–1973)
Déodat de Séverac (1872–1921)
Jean Roger-Ducasse (1873–1954)
Reynaldo Hahn (1874–1947)
Maurice Ravel (1875–1937)
Henriette Renié (1875–1956)
Armande de Polignac (1876–1962)
Louis Aubert (1877–1968)
Gabriel Dupont (1878–1914)
André Caplet (1878–1925)
Jean Cras (1879–1932)
Philippe Gaubert (1879–1941)
Maurice Delage (1879–1961)
Marcel Tournier (1879–1951)
Joseph Canteloube (1879–1957)
Paul Le Flem (1881–1984)
Edgard Varèse (1883–1965)
Henri Collet (1885–1951)
Marcel Dupré  (1886–1971)
Nadia Boulanger (1887–1979)
Louis Durey (1888–1979)
Jacques Ibert (1890–1962)
Marcel Grandjany (1891–1975)
Darius Milhaud (1892–1974)
Germaine Tailleferre (1892–1983)
Lili Boulanger (1893–1918)
 Marcel Lanquetuit (1894–1985)
Jean Rivier (1896–1987)
Francis Poulenc (1899–1963)
Georges Auric (1899–1983)
Henri Sauguet (1901–1989)
Henri Tomasi (1901–1971)
Maurice Duruflé (1902–1986)
Claude Arrieu (1903–1990)
Manuel Rosenthal (1904–2003)
Eugene Bozza  (1905–1991)
André Jolivet (1905–1974)
Jean Langlais (1907–1991)
Olivier Messiaen (1908–1992)
Jean-Yves Daniel-Lesur (1908–2002)
Jean Martinon (1910–1976)
Paule Maurice (1910–1967)
Jehan Alain (1911–1940)
Alfred Desenclos (1912–1971)
Jean Françaix (1912–1997)
Maurice Ohana (1913–1992)
Henri Dutilleux (1916–2013)
Pierre Boulez (1925–2016)
Betsy Jolas (born 1926)
Jean-Michel Damase (1928–2013)
Pierre Max Dubois (1930–1995)
Claude Bolling (1930–2020)
Éliane Radigue (born 1932)
Yves Prin (born 1933)
Gilbert Amy (born 1936)
Jean-Pierre Leguay (born 1939)
Gérard Grisey (1946–1998)
Tristan Murail (born 1947)
Joël-François Durand (born 1954)
Pascal Dusapin (born 1955)
Pierre Pincemaille (1956–2018)
Nicolas Bacri (born 1961)
Marc-André Dalbavie (born 1961)
Sophie Lacaze (born 1963)
Thierry Escaich (born 1965)
Christophe Bertrand (1981–2010)

See also

 List of classical music composers by era
 List of French composers
 Classic 100 Music of France (ABC)

France
Composers, Classical
French music-related lists
Classical music lists